King Georges Road is a major arterial road in Sydney, Australia, running through the local government areas of the Georges River Council and City of Canterbury-Bankstown. 

King Georges Road begins at a junction with the Princes Highway at Blakehurst and continues north-west for about 12 kilometres through the suburbs of South Hurstville, Hurstville, Penshurst, Beverly Hills, Roselands and Wiley Park to Punchbowl, where it becomes Wiley Avenue for a short distance and then Roberts Road. 

King Georges Road is the southernmost section of the A3, which through various name changes continues to the city's northern beaches area, reaching the coast at Mona Vale.

Former names
King Georges Road was previously known as Wiley's Ave between Punchbowl Road and Canterbury Road, Canary's Road between Canterbury Road and Beverly Hills, Dumbleton Road between Beverly Hills and Penshurst, and Belmore Road between Penshurst and Blakehurst. The new name was proclaimed on 24 September 1952, presumably in honour of the late King George VI who had died the previous February.

See also

 Taren Point Road

References

Sydney Metroads